Bacalhau à Gomes de Sá is a casserole of bacalhau, potatoes, eggs, olives, olive oil, and onion. It is a specialty of the northern Portuguese city of Porto.

Origin of the name
Gomes de Sá was the son of a rich 19th century merchant (apparently he dealt in cod) in Porto. The family fortune dwindled and the son had to find a job at Restaurante Lisbonense, a restaurant in downtown Porto where he created this recipe.

See also
 List of casserole dishes

References

Portuguese cuisine
Casserole dishes
Fish dishes
Culture in Porto
Potato dishes
Egg dishes
Olive dishes